Marius Plotius Sacerdos was a Roman grammarian who flourished towards the end of the third century CE.  He wrote an ars grammatica in three books, the third of which treats of meter.

References

External links
Sacerdotis artes, Corpus Grammaticorum Latinorum (Keil)

Grammarians of Latin
Post–Silver Age Latin writers
Ancient linguists
3rd-century Romans
3rd-century Latin writers